International Hits is a 2001 compilation album of songs recorded by American singer Jo Stafford. It was released on January 1, 2001, by Corinthian Records, the company founded by Stafford and her husband Paul Weston.

Track listing

 Little Man With a Candy Cigar		 	 
 Around the Corner		 	 
 Allentown Jail		 	 
 On London Bridge		 	 
 No Other Love		 	 
 Come Rain or Come Shine		 	 
 Long Ago (and Far Away)		 	 
 September Song		 	 
 Teach Me Tonight		 	 
 Keep It a Secret

References

2001 compilation albums
Jo Stafford compilation albums
Corinthian Records compilation albums